Ossago Lodigiano is a comune (municipality) in the Province of Lodi in the Italian region Lombardy, located about  southeast of Milan and about  southeast of Lodi.

Ossago Lodigiano borders the following municipalities: Cavenago d'Adda, San Martino in Strada, Massalengo, Mairago, Villanova del Sillaro, Brembio, Borghetto Lodigiano.

References

External links
 Official website }

Cities and towns in Lombardy